Black Meldon is a prehistoric site, a hillfort near the village of Lyne and about  west of Peebles, in the Scottish Borders, Scotland. It is a Scheduled Monument.

Description
The hill has elevation . There is a gentle slope from the summit on the west side, steeper on other sides. On the north, west and south sides there is the debris of an outer wall.

Within the fort, at least three house-platforms have been detected.

References

Hill forts in Scotland
Archaeological sites in the Scottish Borders
Scheduled Ancient Monuments in the Scottish Borders
Mountains and hills of the Scottish Borders